Īshān (all deriving from Persian  'they') is an honorific title given to Sufi leaders in Central Asia. Quoting Jianping Wang, "In the Sufi doctrine found in E[ast] Turkestan, the ishan has a divine nature, acting as an intermediary between Muslims and Allah. An ishan has absolute power in his group, and can nominate his khalifa and hafiz as well as initiating maulid and buwi into the suborder. Usually, an ishan will have inherited his position from within his family and pass it on to his descendants."

List of īshāns
 Āfāq Khwāja
 Dūkchī Īshān

See also
 Shaykh

References

Persian words and phrases
Religious leadership roles
Sufism